"" is the 16th single by Zard and released 28 August 1995 under B-Gram Records label. The single debuted at #1 rank first week. It charted for 8 weeks and sold over 551,000 copies.

Track list
All songs are written by Izumi Sakai.

composer: Seiichiro Kuribayashi/arrangement: Takeshi Hayama
the song was used in movie (based from dorama) Shiratori Reiko de gozaimasu! as theme song

composer: Izumi Sakai/arrangement: Daisuke Ikeda
 (original karaoke)
 (original karaoke)

References

1995 singles
Zard songs
Songs written by Izumi Sakai
Oricon Weekly number-one singles
1995 songs
Songs written by Seiichiro Kuribayashi